Course of Freedom is a left-wing Greek political party founded on 19 April 2016, by former President of the Hellenic Parliament, Zoe Konstantopoulou.

History 
After the agreement for the Third Economic Adjustment Programme for Greece by the first government of SYRIZA-ANEL, Zoe Konstantopoulou dissociated herself from the views of the party and participated in the following legislative elections as the leader of Popular Unity in Athens A'. However, the party did not manage to achieve the electoral threshold for representation in the legislature.

On 19 April 2016 she announced the founding of Course of Freedom. According to its founding declaration, the party's purpose of action consists of: Democracy, justice, transparency, rights, debt cancellation and claim for World War II reparations.

The founding event was attended, among others, by Rachel Makri, Nadia Valavani, Aglaia Kiritsi, Giannis Stathas (all four were parliamentarians with Syriza who left in 2015), Manousos Manousakis, Charis Sozos, Vasia Panagopoulou, Avgi Voutsina and Deppy Golema.

Electoral performance

European Parliament

Hellenic Parliament

Logo 
There are six Deltas depicted in the party's logo which correspond to its purpose of action as stated in its founding declaration.
Democracy (Dimokratía)
Justice (dikaiosýni)
Transparency (Diafáneia)
Rights (Dikaiómata)
Debt cancellation (Diagrafí chréous)
Claim for World War II reparations (Diekdíkisi ton Germanikón ofeilón tou Deftérou Pankosmíou Polémou)

References

2016 establishments in Greece
Euroscepticism in Greece
Eurosceptic parties in Greece
Political parties established in 2016
Political parties in Greece
Socialist parties in Greece